Soavina is a rural commune in Analamanga Region, in the  Central Highlands of Madagascar. It belongs to the district of Antananarivo-Atsimondrano and its populations numbers to 15,658 in 2018.

It is limited by the Ikopa River in the north-east and the Sisaony in the west. It's located at 15 km from Antananarivo.

References

Populated places in Analamanga